Mahmood Hussain was a Pakistani field hockey player, who played for the international side between 1984 and 1990.

He was born at Sialkot, and played hockey at the Forward position. He played 27 international matches, scoring 13 goals. He is the brother of ex-Pakistan hockey captain Manzoor Hussain Junior.

References

Pakistani male field hockey players
Field hockey players from Sialkot
Living people
Year of birth missing (living people)